Aechmea azurea is a plant species in the genus Aechmea. This species is endemic to the State of Espírito Santo in eastern Brazil. It is a vulnerable species of the Atlantic rainforest ecosystem

References

azurea
Flora of Brazil
Plants described in 1950
Vulnerable flora of South America